Élie Allégret (8 January 1865 – 28 October 1940) was a French Protestant pastor and missionary in Africa.

Biography 
Élie Allégret studied at the Protestant Faculty of Theology in Paris.

In 1885, he was invited by Juliette Rondeaux, widow of University of Paris law professor Paul Gide (1832–1880) and mother of writer André Gide, to the château de La Roque-Baignard to work as the private tutor of André and direct both his reading and his religious education.

In 1914, at the outbreak of World War I, Allégret, who had become a military chaplain, went on a mission to Cameroon before becoming co-director of the Société des evangelical missions.

After the end of World War I, Allégret left on a mission around the world. Between July 1926 and February 1928, he traveled through Oceania.

Family 
En 1891, Élie Allégret married Suzanne Ehrhardt (1869–1950). They had six children: Jean-Paul (1894–1930), Éric (1896–1971), André, Marc (1900–1973), Yves (1905–1987) and Valentine (1909–1988). Jean-Paul and André were born in Talagouga, in Africa. Éric was born in Paris when Élie was working at the headquarters of the Société des evangelical missions in Paris. Filmmaker Marc Allégret was born in Basel, Switzerland, followed by Yves Allégret, also a filmmaker, in Paris where the family had settled in 1903.

Élie Allégret is the biological grandfather of Catherine Allégret.

Suzanne Ehrhardt had a sister, Valentine Ehrhardt (1873–1906), who also participated in evangelical missions.

Correspondence with André Gide 
Allégret was the tutor and friend of the writer André Gide. The two met in 1885, and quickly developed a deep friendship.

In 1889, Allégret wrote whilst aboard the ship Portugal, en route to Gabon. A significant correspondence maintained their bond of friendship, especially during Allégret's long stays in Africa.

In 1914, after Élie Allégret departed for a mission of evangelization in Cameroon, Suzanne Allégret established her own correspondence with André Gide. Suzanne, matriarch of the family with six children, would recount in detail the activities of each, at the request of André Gide.

Honours and distinctions 
 Namesake of the Collège Élie Allégret de Bandjoun
 1909: honoris causa doctorate from the University of Geneva
 1919:  Chevalier of the Legion of Honour

References

Bibliography 

 Pierre Billard, André Gide et Marc Allégret, le roman secret, Plon, 2006
 Émilie Gangnat, « Élie Allégret », in Patrick Cabanel et André Encrevé (dir.), Dictionnaire biographique des protestants français de 1787 à nos jours, tome 1 : A-C, Les Éditions de Paris Max Chaleil, Paris, 2015,  
 Pierre Masson, Jean Claude, André Gide et l'écriture  de soi, Presses Universitaires de Lyon, 2002
 Alexandra Loumpet-Galitzine, Njoya et le royaume bamoun, les archives de la Société des missions évangéliques de Paris, éditions Karthala, 2006.  
L'Enfance de l'art. Correspondances avec Élie Allégret (1886–1896). Lettres d'André Gide, Juliette Gide, Madeleine Rondeaux et Élie Allégret, éd. Daniel Durosay. Gallimard, Paris : 1998
Why Do We Need the White Man’s God? African Contributions and Responses to the Formation of a Christian Movement in Cameroon, 1914–1968  Guy Alexander Thomas (thèse de PhD) University of London, 2001     https://eprints.soas.ac.uk/29549/1/10731705.pdf 

1865 births
1940 deaths
20th-century French theologians
21st-century French theologians
Clergy from Lyon
Clergy from Paris
French Protestant missionaries
French military chaplains
Protestant missionaries in Cameroon
Protestant missionaries in Gabon
Protestant Faculty of Theology in Paris
Chevaliers of the Légion d'honneur